Kenneth George Baker (24 August 1934 – 13 August 2016) was an English actor, comedian and musician. He portrayed the character R2-D2 in the Star Wars franchise and also appeared in The Elephant Man, Time Bandits, Willow, Flash Gordon, Amadeus, and Labyrinth.

Early life 
Baker was born and educated in Birmingham, Warwickshire, and at a boarding school in Kent. He was the son of Ethel (1906–1990), a pianist and dress maker, and Harold Baker (1908–1985), an artist, musician and draughtsman. He went to live with his father, stepmother and half-sister in Hastings, Sussex.

Career

Beginnings 
In 1951, Baker was approached on the street by a woman who invited him to join John Lester's theatrical troupe of dwarfs and midgets. This was his first taste of show business. Later, he joined a circus for a brief time, learned to ice skate and appeared in many ice shows. He formed a successful comedy act called the Minitones with entertainer Jack Purvis and played in nightclubs.

Star Wars 
While working with Purvis and the Minitones, Baker was selected by George Lucas to operate the robot ("droid") R2-D2 in the fantasy feature film Star Wars, released in 1977. Baker recalled that he initially turned down the role, concerned about breaking up the Minitones partnership when  the duo had reached the final on the British television talent show Opportunity Knocks.

Baker appears as R2-D2 in six of the episodic theatrical Star Wars films, and played an additional role in 1983's Return of the Jedi as Paploo, the Ewok who steals an Imperial speeder bike. He was originally due to play Wicket, but he fell ill and that role was handed over to Warwick Davis.

Baker continued his association with the R2-D2 character in Star Wars: The Force Awakens, which was released on 18 December 2015 in North America. He was going to be a member of the cast, but he served as consultant for the character instead. In November 2015, it was confirmed that Jimmy Vee was cast as R2-D2 in Star Wars: The Last Jedi, replacing Baker.

As technology grew and the need to have Baker in the suit decreased over time, he was used sporadically in the prequel trilogy. In Star Wars Episode II: Attack of the Clones, he was used in just one scene.

Other work 
Baker's other films include The Elephant Man, Time Bandits (also with Jack Purvis), Willow (also with Purvis and Warwick Davis), Flash Gordon, Amadeus and Jim Henson's Labyrinth.

On television, he appeared in the British medical drama Casualty. He also had a part in the BBC production of The Chronicles of Narnia. In the late 1990s, Baker launched a brief comedy career. He played Casanova in the 1993 movie UFO.

In November 2009, his biography, From Tiny Acorns: The Kenny Baker Story, was written with Ken Mills and published by Writestuff Autographs.

Personal life and death 
Baker resided in Preston, Lancashire. He was married to actress Eileen Baker (who co-starred with him in the 1977 film Wombling Free) from 1970 until she died in 1993. Although Eileen also had dwarfism, this was not inherited by their two children.

Baker was invited to attend the premiere of Star Wars: The Force Awakens in Los Angeles in December 2015, but was too ill to travel to the US. He had been living with a lung condition for years. Instead, Baker attended the film's premiere in London.

Kenny Baker died on 13 August 2016, 11 days shy of his 82nd birthday.

Filmography

References

External links 

 

1934 births
2016 deaths
20th-century English comedians
20th-century English male actors
21st-century English comedians
Actors from Preston, Lancashire
Actors with dwarfism
English male comedians
English male film actors
English male television actors
Male actors from Birmingham, West Midlands
Wheelchair users